Super Mario World is a 1990 platforming video game developed by Nintendo for the Super Nintendo Entertainment System.

Super Mario World may also refer to:
Super Mario World (TV series), an animated TV series based on Super Mario World
"Super Mario World", a 2016 song from rapper Logic's Bobby Tarantino mixtape

See also
Super Mario World 2: Yoshi's Island, a 1995 game for the SNES and the sequel to Super Mario World
Super Mario 3D World, a 3D platforming video game developed by Nintendo for the Wii U and a sequel to the 2011 Nintendo 3DS game Super Mario 3D Land